Events in the year 1927 in Norway.

Incumbents
Monarch – Haakon VII

Events

 Norsk Hydro forms a companionship with the German company IG Farben in order to gain access to the newly developed Haber-Bosch process for manufacturing artificial fertilizer. By 1945 IG Farben has become majority shareholder.
 The 1927 Parliamentary election takes place.

Popular culture

Sports

 The first ski jumping hill of Midtstubakken was constructed.
 Oslo hosted the World Figure Skating Championships.

Music

Film

Literature
Arbeidermagasinet established.
The Knut Hamsund novel Landstrykere Volume 1 & 2 (Wayfarers), was published.
The two books of Olav Audunssøn, by Sigrid Undset, was published.

Arts
The avant-garde theatre Balkongen is started by Agnes Mowinckel.

Sport 
 The first ski jumping hill of Midtstubakken was constructed in 1927
 Oslo hosted the 1927 World Figure Skating Championships

Notable births
7 January - Jan Bull, author and theatre instructor (died 1985)
18 January
 Jack Erik Kjuus, anti-immigration politician (died 2009)
 Johannes Østtveit, politician (died 2013)
27 January – Torvild Aakvaag, businessperson (died 2020).
30 January – Odd Blomdal, judge and civil servant (died 2015)
5 February – Kristian Kvakland, sculptor and artist
14 February – Kjell Thorbjørn Kristensen, politician (died 1995)
17 February – Leif Kolflaath, politician (died 2001)
7 March – John Olav Larssen, evangelical preacher and missionary (died 2009)
15 March – Else Breen, children's writer, novelist and literary scientist. 
16 March – Gunnar Vada, politician
20 March – Marie Borge Refsum, politician
29 March – Bjørge Lillelien, sports journalist and commentator (died 1987)
31 March – Knut Frydenlund, politician and Minister (died 1987)
3 April – Arne Johansen, speed skater and Olympic bronze medallist (died 2013).
4 April – Sigurd Kalheim, politician (died 2007)
5 April – Arne Hoel, ski jumper (died 2006)
24 April – Ingerid Vardund, actress (died 2006)
29 April – Harald U. Lied, politician (died 2002)
10 May – Eva Knardahl, pianist (died 2006)
13 May – Willy Jansson, politician
16 May – Jan W. Dietrichson, Norwegian philologist
19 May – Sivert Langholm, historian
23 May – Bodil Skjånes Dugstad, politician (died 2021).
30 May – Thor Knudsen, politician (died 2006)
4 June – Sigurd Verdal, politician (died 2010)
6 July – Finn Backer, judge (died 2015)
15 July – Håkon Brusveen, cross country skier and Olympic gold medallist (died 2021).
20 July – Asbjørn Sjøthun, politician (died 2010)

2 August
 Fredrik Bull-Hansen, military officer (died 2018) 
 Willy Haugli, jurist and Oslo chief of police (died 2009).
10 August – Eivind Eckbo, politician, lawyer and farmer (died 2017)
17 August – Gunnar Gravdahl, politician (died 2015)
20 August – Ole Vatnan, civil servant.
2 September – Hans Frette, politician (died 1989)
16 September – Gina Sigstad, cross country skier (died 2015)
26 September – Rolv Hellesylt, judge
27 September – Egil Bakke, civil servant
28 September – Jorunn Bjørg Giske, politician (died 2021).
8 October – Torbjørn Falkanger, ski jumper (died 2013).
3 November – Odvar Nordli, politician and Prime Minister of Norway (died 2018).
4 November – Målfrid Floan Belbo, politician
5 November – Benn John Valsø, bobsledder (died 1995).
8 November – Ingrid Bjoner, opera singer (died 2006)
8 November – Kåre Øistein Hansen, politician (died 2012).
30 November – Kjell Venås, philologist (died 2018).
5 December – Per Gjelten, Nordic skier (died 1991).
11 December – Stein Eriksen, alpine skier, Olympic gold medallist and World Champion (died 2015).
11 December – Trygve Moe, journalist
15 December – Ole N. Hoemsnes, journalist
21 December – Åge Hovengen, politician (died 2018).
22 December – Norvald Tveit, writer and playwright (died 2022).
27 December – Odd Hoftun, engineer and missionary.

Notable deaths
14 February – Hermann Hansen Aarsrud, politician (born 1837).
22 March – Ingebrigt Vik, sculptor (born 1867)
9 April – Georg Ossian Sars, marine biologist (born 1837)
11 April – Anna Schønheyder, painter and textile artist (born 1877).
25 July – Christian Fredrik Michelet, politician and Minister (born 1863)
7 September – Bernhard Brænne, politician and Minister (born 1854)
October – Adolf Nilsen, rower and Olympic bronze medallist (born 1895)
1 October – Johan Friele, sailor and Olympic gold medallist (born 1866)
4 November – Ole Olsen, organist, composer, conductor and military musician (born 1850)
11 November – Kristian Prestrud, polar explorer (born 1881)
8 December – Hjalmar August Schiøtz, ophthalmologist (born 1850)
25 December – Oskar Omdal, Norwegian Navy pilot (born 1895)

Full date unknown
Christian Bjelland I, businessperson (born 1858)

See also

References

External links